Juanchaco is a village in Buenaventura Municipality, Valle del Cauca Department in Colombia. The Juanchaco Airport serves both Juanchaco and the nearby village of Ladrilleros.

Climate
Juanchaco has an extremely wet tropical rainforest climate (Af) with very heavy to extremely heavy rainfall year-round.

References

Populated places in the Valle del Cauca Department